Elections to the Mizoram Legislative Assembly were held in November 1998 to elect members of the 40 constituencies in Mizoram, India. The Mizo National Front won the most seats and its leader, Zoramthanga was appointed as the Chief Minister of Mizoram. The Indian National Congress won the popular vote. Zoramthanga had become the leader of the Mizo National Front in 1990, after the death of its previous leader, Laldenga.

Result

Elected Members

See also 
 List of constituencies of the Mizoram Legislative Assembly
 1998 elections in India

References

Mizoram
1998
1998